William Henry Augustus Bissell (November 10, 1814 - May 14, 1893) was the second bishop of Vermont in the Episcopal Church in the United States of America.

Education
Bissell was born on November 10, 1814, in Randolph, Vermont, the son of  Ezekiel Bissell and Elizabeth Washburn. He graduated from the University of Vermont in 1836 and commenced his teaching career in Detroit. He also studied theology at Vermont Episcopal Institute.

Ordination
Bissell was ordained deacon on September 29, 1839, by Bishop Benjamin T. Onderdonk of New York. He was ordained a priest a year later on August 2 by the same bishop. Bissell served as assistant of Christ Church in Troy, New York. In 1941 he was appointed rector of Trinity Church in Watervliet, New York, a post he held until 1845 when he became rector of Grace Church in Lyons, New York. In 1848 he was appointed rector of Trinity Church in Geneva, New York.

Episcopacy
Bissell was elected Bishop of Vermont in 1868 and consecrated bishop on June 3, 1868, by Samuel A. McCoskry Bishop of Michigan and co-consecrated by John Williams of Connecticut, Horatio Potter of New York, Arthur Cleveland Coxe of Western New York and Henry A. Neely of Maine. Bissell died on May 14, 1893, in Burlington, Vermont.

Personal life
Bissell married Martha Cotton Moulton on August 25, 1838, and had four children.

References

1814 births
1893 deaths
Episcopal bishops of Vermont
People from Randolph, Vermont
University of Vermont alumni
Burials in Ohio
19th-century American Episcopalians
19th-century American clergy